Roy J. Plunkett (June 26, 1910 – May 12, 1994) was an American chemist. He discovered polytetrafluoroethylene (PTFE), better known as Teflon, in 1938.

Personal life and education
Plunkett was born in New Carlisle, Ohio and attended Newton High School in Pleasant Hill, Ohio.

He graduated from  Manchester University with a B.A. in chemistry in 1932. He received his Ph.D. in chemistry in 1936 from Ohio State University for his work on The Mechanism  of  Carbohydrate Oxidation.

He married Dorothy Enola Detrick, b. 1907, d 1984 on 16 Aug. 1935 in Franklin, Ohio. Next, he married Lois Mary Koch, b. 1925, d. 1996 on 24 May 1965 in Arlington, Virginia.

Plunkett died of cancer on May 12, 1994, at his Texas home at the age of 83.

Career

In 1936 he was hired as a research chemist by E.I. du Pont de Nemours and Company at their Jackson Laboratory in Deepwater, New Jersey.

While attempting to make a new chlorofluorocarbon refrigerant in 1938, Plunkett discovered polytetrafluoroethylene (PTFE), better known as Teflon. Plunkett shared the story of his accidental discovery at the spring meeting of the American Chemical Society national meeting in the History of Chemistry section, April 1986 in New York City which was published in the Symposium Proceedings:

On the morning of April 6, 1938, Jack Rebok, my assistant, selected one of the TFE cylinders that we had been using the previous day and set up the apparatus ready to go. When he opened the valve — to let the TFE gas flow under its own pressure from the cylinder — nothing happened...We were in a quandary. I couldn't think of anything else to do under the circumstances, so we unscrewed the valve from the cylinder. By this time it was pretty clear that there wasn't any gas left. I carefully tipped the cylinder upside down, and out came a whitish powder down onto the lab bench. We scraped around some with the wire inside the cylinder...to get some more of the powder. What I got out that way certainly didn't add up, so I knew there must be more, inside. Finally...we decided to cut open the cylinder. When we did, we found more of the powder packed onto the bottom and lower sides of the cylinder.

The tetrafluoroethylene in the container had polymerized into polytetrafluoroethylene, a waxy solid with that was found to have had properties such as resistance to corrosion, low surface friction, and high heat resistance. 

Later in his career, Plunkett was the chief chemist involved in the production of tetraethyllead, an antiknock agent that made gasoline "leaded," later discontinued over concerns about the toxic effects of lead. After that, he directed the production of Freon, DuPont's brand name for chlorofluorocarbon refrigerant, before retiring in 1975.

Awards
Plunkett received the John Scott Medal from the city of Philadelphia in 1951, for an invention promoting the "comfort, welfare, and happiness of humankind". Attendees were given a Teflon-coated muffin tin to take home. Other awards and honors followed. Plunkett was inducted into the Plastics Hall of Fame in 1973  and the National Inventors Hall of Fame in 1985.

References

Further reading
 George B. Kauffman. "Plunkett, Roy Joseph" in American National Biography (1999) [www.anb.org/viewbydoi/10.1093/anb/9780198606697.article.1302553  online]
 Raymond B. Seymour and Charles H. Fisher. "Roy J. Plunkett," in Profiles of Eminent American Chemists, ed. Sylvia Tascher (1988), pp. 381–84.
 Findagrave link

External links
 
 

1910 births
1994 deaths
Manchester University (Indiana) alumni
DuPont people
Ohio State University Graduate School alumni
Polymer scientists and engineers
People from New Carlisle, Ohio
20th-century American inventors